Havre Public Schools is a school district headquartered in Havre, Montana.

The district, in Hill County, includes Havre, East End Colony, Havre North, Herron, Hilldale Colony, Saddle Butte, West Havre, and most of Beaver Creek.

History
Dennis Parman serves as superintendent until 2009, when he became the deputy superintendent of the Montana Office of Public Instruction. David Mahon replaced him. In 2010 Mahon resigned and the board accepted his resignation.

In August 2021, during the COVID-19 pandemic in Montana, the district chose to keep masks optional.

Schools
 Havre High School
 Havre Middle School
 Sunnyside Intermediate School
 Lincoln-McKinley Primary School
 Highland Park Early Primary School

References

External links
 

School districts in Montana
Education in Hill County, Montana